Hunucmá is a town and the municipal seat of the Hunucmá Municipality, Yucatán in Mexico. As of 2020, the town has a population of 28,412.

Demographics

Climate

References 

Populated places in Yucatán
Municipality seats in Yucatán